Rachel Pain is Professor of Human Geography at Newcastle University since 2017 and was elected a Fellow of the Academy of Social Sciences in 2018.

In 2022, she is conference chair of the Royal Geographical Society with the Institute of British Geographers annual conference. She previously served as Deputy Head of Department of Geography at Durham University, and was also the Co-Founder/Director of the Centre for Social Justice and Community Action and the Participatory Research Hub. Per Scopus, Pain has a h-index of 42.

Research 
Pain is a social geographer whose work draws upon feminist geography and participatory action research. She has published widely on issues of violence, community safety, trauma and fear, with specific attention being given to issues of gender-based violence. in 2019, she received the Urban Studies Best Article for 2019 award for her article "Chronic urban trauma: The slow violence of housing dispossession", and In 2020, she presented the Distinguished Jan Monk lecture.

Awards 
 2022 IGU Distinguished Practice Award 
 2022 Jan Monk Service Award
 2019 Urban Studies Best Paper Award
 2018 Fellow of the Academy of Social Sciences
 2009 Julian Minghi Outstanding Research Award of the Political Geography Specialty Group of the Association of American Geographers (for ‘Fear: Critical Geopolitics and Everyday Life’, with Susan Smith)
 2008 Royal Geographical Society Gill Memorial Award (for contributions to social geography and participatory research)
 2005 Philip Leverhulme Prize

Key publications 
 Newcastle Social Geographies Collective (2020) Social Geographies: An Introduction. London: Rowman & Littlefield.
 Smith S J, Pain R, Marston S, Jones J P (2010) Handbook of Social Geographies. London: Sage
 Pain R and Smith S J (2008) Fear: Critical Geopolitics and Everyday Life. Aldershot: Ashgate
 Kindon S, Pain R and Kesby M (2007) Participatory Action Research Approaches and Methods:  Connecting People, Participation and Place. London: Routledge
 Pain R, Barke M, Gough J, Fuller D, MacFarlane R, Mowl G (2001) Introducing Social Geographies. Arnold, London

References

Year of birth missing (living people)
Living people
British geographers